The BenQ P30 is a 2.5G smartphone from BenQ that uses the UIQ platform based upon Symbian OS.

The phone was released into the marketplace in October 2004, primarily in Far Eastern markets.

Specifications
 User interface: UIQ 2.1
 Operating system: Symbian OS v7.0
 Display: 65 536 colors, 16-bit TFT touch-screen
 Display size: 2.6", 208x320 pixels
 Dimensions: 118 x 52 x 17 mm
 Weight: 150 g
 Standby time: 120 hours
 Talk time: 5 hours
 Memory card: SD / MMC
 Network: Triband 900/1800/1900 MHz
 GPRS class 10 for wireless data services

Features
 Digital camera with VGA resolution
 Multimedia: MP3 and MPEG4 audio and video
 Web: WAP2.0 browser
 Messaging: Email, MMS, SMS
 PIM functionality: Contacts, Calendar, Notes, etc.
 Connectivity: USB, Infrared and Bluetooth
 Handwriting input i-Tap
 Document viewer
 Voice recognition
 Photo album
 Built-in handsfree
 Conference call
 Open development environment: Java MIDP 2.0

References

External links
 UIQ Official UIQ website
 BenQ BenQ website
 Symbian UIQ Users Site

Smartphones
Mobile phones introduced in 2004
BenQ mobile phones